The 2015 season is Rosenborg's 25th consecutive year in Tippeligaen, their 48th season in the top flight of Norwegian football and first season with Kåre Ingebrigtsen as permanent manager. They will participate in Tippeligaen, the Cup and the 2015–16 UEFA Europa League, entering at the First qualifying round stage.

Squad

Transfers

Winter

In:

Out:

Summer

In:

Out:

Competitions

Tippeligaen

Results summary

Results by round

Results

Table

Norwegian Cup

Final

Europa League

Qualifying phase

Group stage

Copa del Sol

Group stage

Club Friendlies

Squad statistics

Appearances and goals

|-
|colspan="14"|Players who appeared for Rosenborg no longer at the club:

|}

Disciplinary record

References 

2015
Rosenborg
Norwegian football championship-winning seasons